Studio 100 is a Belgian production company with four television channels, four animation studios and eight theme parks all over the world. The headquarters of the group is in Schelle, along with offices in Breda, Munich, Paris, New York, Sydney and Los Angeles.

History 
Studio 100 was founded in 1996 by Gert Verhulst, Danny Verbiest and Hans Bourlon. The three came together for seven years when they created the show Samson & Gert, in which Verhulst and Verbiest also starred. Besides the production of their original show they started creating a new series called Kabouter Plop. Following the success of these two shows, the company expanded into new fields in 1999. They produced two new television series, a film, a musical and owned a theme park. For the latter three they required co-funding from the Vlaamse Media Maatschappij. In 2000, they also saw the acquiring of the three-piece girl group K3 and in the following years with the number of television series, films and musicals produced by Studio 100 in which they grew.

In 2005, Danny Verbiest announced his retirement from Samson & Gert, but also as a shareholder of the company. The shares were bought by Verhulst and Bourlon, but in a year later, the shares were sold to BNP Paribas Fortis Private Equity. With the new ownership the company ventured into the international, non-Dutch speaking, market by copying their original shows in other languages and creating new shows like Bumba.

Their international expansion took flight in 2008 when they founded a Belgian digital television channel called Studio 100 TV, an animation studio in Paris and Studio 100 Media, a German division to sell their content to the international market. Later that year they acquired EM.Entertainment, a division of EM.Sports Media, for €41 million. EM.Entertainment owned a large library with classics as Vicky the Viking and Maya the Bee, a television channel called JuniorTV (closed in 2022) and the Australian Flying Bark Productions. Over the next years, the company revamped the old classics they acquired and established a new cooking channel, called Njam!, in Belgium in 2010 and BeJunior in the Middle East and North Africa in 2016.

The year 2017 was the next big step for the growth of the company when they acquired the US-based animation studio Little Airplane Productions, and their subsidiary Studio 100 Media took a majority share in the Germany-based Made 4 Entertainment (m4e), a company with a wide catalogue with series like Tip the Mouse and former TV-Loonland AG library. Their share was increased over time until they reached full ownership in 2020, after spinning off some m4e subsidiaries. Their fourth animation studio, called Studio Isar Animation, was founded in 2018 by Studio 100 Media in Munich. In 2020, their animation studio Flying Bark Production opened a second studio in Los Angeles.

The theme-park division, Plopsa, also grew significantly. After taking full control of Plopsaland in 2005, they opened a couple of new theme parks in Hasselt (2005), Dalen (2010) and co-opened a theme park in Torzym (2018). The division also owned theme parks in Stavelot (2005), Haßloch (2010), Antwerp (2019) and created water parks in De Panne (2015) and Hannuit-Landen (2020). With expansions planned in four countries: Belgium, Poland, Czech Republic and The Netherlands.

On 7 February 2020, the ownership of the group shifted again when Vic Swerts and 3D Investors acquired 17% en 8% of the shares respectively. After the transaction Gert Verhulst, Hans Bourlon and BNP Paribas Fortis Private Equity had a remaining 25% share each.

See also 
 List of assets owned by Studio 100
 List of Studio 100 productions

References

External links 
 Studio 100 Group official website

Television channels and stations established in 1996
1996 establishments in Belgium
Television networks in Belgium
Dutch-language television networks
IFPI members